This is a List of Privy Counsellors of the United Kingdom appointed during the reign of Queen Victoria, from 1837 to 1901.

Victoria

1837
The Earl of Ilchester (1787–1858)
The Earl of Surrey (1791–1856)

1838
Stephen Lushington (1782–1873)

1839
Viscount Ebrington (1783–1861)
Sir George Grey, Bt (1799–1882)
The Earl of Uxbridge (1797–1869)
Charles Shaw-Lefevre (1794–1888)
Sir Charles Metcalfe, Bt (1785–1846)
Francis Baring (1796–1866)
Richard Lalor Sheil (1791–1851)
Thomas Babington Macaulay (1800–1859)

1840
The Earl of Clarendon (1800–1870)
The Lord Kinnaird (1807–1878)
Prince Albert of Saxe-Coburg and Gotha (1819–1861)

1841
Sir Joseph Littledale (1767–1842)
Lord Marcus Hill (1798–1863)
The Lord Campbell (1779–1861)
Hon. Fox Maule (1801–1874)
Hon. Edward Stanley (1802–1869)
Robert Vernon Smith (1800–1873)
The Duke of Buckingham and Chandos (1797–1861)
The Earl of Liverpool (1784–1851)
Lord Eliot (1798–1877)
Lord Ernest Bruce (1811–1886)
The Earl of Lincoln (1811–1864)
William Ewart Gladstone (1809–1898)
The Marquess of Exeter (1795–1867)
The Marquess of Lothian (1794–1841)
The Earl De La Warr (1791–1869)
The Earl of Rosslyn (1802–1866)
The Lord Forester (1801–1874)
Hon. George Dawson-Damer (1788–1856)
John Nicholl (1797–1853)
Earl Jermyn (1800–1864)

1842
The Earl of Beverley (1778–1867)
James Knight-Bruce (1791–1866)
James Wigram (1793–1866)
The Duke of Buccleuch (1806–1884)

1843
Sir Edward Ryan (1793–1875)
Thomas Pemberton Leigh (1793–1867)
The Earl of Dalhousie (1812–1860)
Richard Pakenham (1797–1868)

1844
Sir Frederick Pollock (1783–1870)
John Hope (1794–1858)
Sir Thomas Fremantle, Bt (1798–1890)
Sir Henry Pottinger, Bt (1789–1856)

1845
Sidney Herbert (1810–1861)
Sir George Clerk, Bt (1787–1867)
Hon. Bingham Baring (1799–1864)
Henry Bulwer (1801–1872)

1846
Hon. James Stuart-Wortley (1805–1881)
The Marquess of Abercorn (1811–1885)
The Viscount Canning (1812–1862)
The Duke of Bedford (1788–1861)
Charles Wood (1800–1885)
The Earl Spencer (1798–1857)
Lord Edward Howard (1818–1883)
Thomas Milner Gibson (1806–1884)
The Earl Granville (1815–1891)
Sir Thomas Wilde (1782–1855)
Edward Strutt (1801–1880)

1847
Sir George Arthur, Bt (1784–1854)
Hon. William Lascelles (1798–1851)
Sir William Somerville, Bt (1802–1873)
James Stephen (1789–1859)
Richard More O'Ferrall (1797–1880)

1848
Thomas Musgrave (1788–1860)
William Hayter (1792–1878)
John Bird Sumner (1780–1862)
The Earl of Bessborough (1809–1880)
Samuel March Phillipps (1780–1862)
The Marquess of Breadalbane (1796–1862)

1849
Thomas Wyse (1791–1862)
Sir David Dundas (1803–1877)
Matthew Talbot Baines (1799–1860)

1850
The Marquess of Westminster (1795–1869)
Henry Tufnell (1805–1854)
Sir John Jervis (1802–1856)
Sir Robert Rolfe (1790–1868)

1851
Sir John Romilly (1802–1874)
Sir George James Turner (1798–1867)
Andrew Rutherfurd (1791–1854)
The Earl of Mulgrave (1819–1890)
Laurence Sulivan (1783–1866)
Lord Seymour (1804–1885)

1852
Sir John Patteson (1790–1861)
The Lord Cowley (1804–1884)
The Duke of Northumberland (1792–1865)
The Earl of Sandwich (1811–1884)
The Earl of Eglinton (1812–1861)
The Earl of Hardwicke (1799–1873)
The Earl of Malmesbury (1807–1889)
Lord John Manners (1818–1906)
The Lord de Ros (1797–1874)
The Lord Colchester (1798–1867)
Hon. George Weld-Forester (1807–1886)
Sir John Pakington, Bt (1799–1880)
Spencer Horatio Walpole (1806–1898)
Benjamin Disraeli (1804–1881)
J. W. Henley (1793–1884)
Robert Christopher (1804–1877)
William Beresford (1797–1883)
Lord Claud Hamilton (1813–1884)
George Bankes (1788–1856)
Viscount Newport (1819–1898)
Sir John Trollope, Bt (1800–1874)
Sir John Dodson (1780–1858)
Lord Naas (1822–1872)
The Lord Raglan (1788–1855)
Sir John Young, Bt (1807–1876)
Sir William Molesworth, Bt (1810–1855)
Edward Cardwell (1813–1886)

1853
The Viscount Sydney (1805–1890)
The Duke of Argyll (1823–1900)
The Duke of Wellington (1807–1884)
Viscount Drumlanrig (1818–1858)
Hon. Charles Pelham Villiers (1802–1898)
Duncan McNeill (1793–1874)
John Parker (1799–1881)

1854
Henry Addington (1790–1870)
Sir Robert Inglis, Bt (1786–1855)
Sir Benjamin Hall, Bt (1802–1867)

1855
Hon. Henry FitzRoy (1807–1859)
Sir George Cornewall Lewis, Bt (1806–1863)
Edward Horsman (1807–1876)
Hon. Edward Pleydell-Bouverie (1818–1889)
The Earl of Harrowby (1798–1882)
Sir William Henry Maule (1799–1858)
Hon. William Cowper (1811–1888)
Sir Maurice Berkeley (1788–1867)
Robert Lowe (1811–1892)
William Monsell (1812–1894)
Sir George Seymour (1797–1880)

1856
Sir Lawrence Peel (1799–1884)
Prince George, Duke of Cambridge (1819–1904)
Archibald Campbell Tait (1811–1882)

1857
Sir Alexander Cockburn (1802–1880)
Viscount Castlerosse (1825–1905)
The Earl of Elgin (1811–1863)
Evelyn Denison (1800–1873)
Sir John McNeill (1795–1883)
Frederick Peel (1823–1906)
Henry Herbert (1815–1866)
Sir Edmund Head, Bt (1805–1868)

1858
Sir Cresswell Cresswell (1794–1863)
The Duke of Beaufort (1824–1899)
Lord Stanley (1826–1893)
The Lord Chelmsford (1794–1878)
The Earl Talbot (1803–1868)
T. H. S. Sotheron-Estcourt (1801–1876)
Charles Adderley (1814–1905)
Jonathan Peel (1799–1879)
The Earl of Donoughmore (1823–1866)
John Mowbray (1815–1899)
Sir Edward Bulwer-Lytton, Bt (1803–1873)
Sir John Taylor Coleridge (1790–1876)

1859
John Inglis (1810–1891)
The Earl of March (1818–1903)
Lord Lovaine (1810–1899)
Sir John Lawrence, Bt (1811–1879)
The Viscount Gough (1779–1869)
The Marquess of Ailesbury (1804–1878)
Sir William Jolliffe, Bt (1800–1876)
James Wilson (1805–1860)
Thomas Emerson Headlam (1813–1875)
The Earl Spencer (1835–1910)
The Earl of Ducie (1827–1921)
Viscount Bury (1832–1894)
Lord Proby (1824–1872)
Sir William Erle (1793–1880)
Sir James Colvile (1810–1880)

1860
William Hutt (1801–1882)
Charles Longley (1794–1868)
The Lord Bloomfield (1802–1879)

1861
The Lord Napier (1819–1898)
Sir Richard Bethell (1800–1873)
Sir Robert Peel, Bt (1822–1895)

1863
William Thomson (1819–1890)
Sir Andrew Buchanan, Bt (1807–1882)
The Earl de Grey and Ripon (1827–1909)
Albert Edward, Prince of Wales (1841–1910)
Sir William Gibson-Craig, Bt (1797–1878)

1864
Chichester Fortescue (1823–1898)
Sir James Wilde (1816–1899)
Henry Bruce (1815–1895)
The Lord Wodehouse (1826–1902)

1865
William Massey (1809–1881)
The Lord Lyons (1817–1887)
Sir Edward Vaughan Williams (1797–1875)
George Goschen (1831–1907)

1866
The Marquess of Hartington (1833–1908)
The Earl of Cork (1829–1904)
Lord Clarence Paget (1811–1895)
Prince Alfred, Duke of Edinburgh (1844–1900)
Lord Otho FitzGerald (1827–1882)
Edmund Hammond (1802–1890)
Russell Gurney (1804–1878)
Horatio Waddington (1799–1867)
The Duke of Buckingham and Chandos (1823–1889)
The Earl of Carnarvon (1831–1890)
Viscount Cranborne (1830–1903)
Sir Stafford Northcote, Bt (1818–1887)
Gathorne Hardy (1814–1906)
Henry Brand (1814–1892)
The Duke of Marlborough (1822–1883)
The Earl of Devon (1807–1888)
The Earl of Tankerville (1810–1899)
The Earl Cadogan (1812–1873)
Lord Burghley (1825–1895)
Viscount Royston (1836–1897)
The Lord Colville of Culross (1818–1903)
Stephen Cave (1820–1880)
Henry Baillie (1803–1885)
Sir Fitzroy Kelly (1796–1880)
Sir Hugh Cairns (1819–1885)
Sir Richard Kindersley (1792–1879)
Sir Henry Storks (1811–1874)
Sir William Bovill (1814–1873)
William Vesey-FitzGerald (1818–1885)

1867
Lord Robert Montagu (1825–1902)
Hon. Percy Herbert (1822–1876)
John Wilson-Patten (1802–1892)
Sir John Rolt (1804–1871)
Sir Robert Phillimore (1810–1885)
Hon. Henry Elliot (1817–1907)
George Patton (1803–1869)
Sir Francis Head, Bt (1793–1875)

1868
George Ward Hunt (1825–1877)
Sir William Wood (1801–1881)
Sir Charles Jasper Selwyn (1813–1869)
Thomas Edward Taylor (1811–1883)
Lord Augustus Loftus (1817–1904)
Sir Joseph Napier, Bt (1804–1882)
Sir James Fergusson, Bt (1832–1907)
John Bright (1811–1889)
Hugh Childers (1827–1896)
Austen Henry Layard (1817–1894)
William Edward Forster (1818–1886)
Sir Colman O'Loghlen, Bt (1819–1877)
The Lord Dufferin and Clandeboye (1826–1902)

1869
The Lord de Tabley (1811–1887)
Sir George Giffard (1813–1870)
James Stansfeld (1820–1898)
The Duke of St Albans (1840–1898)
The Lord Lyttelton (1817–1876)
John Jackson (1811–1885)
The Viscount Monck (1819–1894)
The Lord Northbrook (1826–1904)
George Hamilton (1802–1871)
James Moncreiff (1811–1895)
Sir Alexander Spearman, Bt (1793–1874)
Acton Smee Ayrton (1816–1886)

1870
James Lawson (1817–1887)
Sir William Milbourne James (1807–1881)
Sir Barnes Peacock (1805–1890)
Sir William Heathcote, Bt (1801–1881)
Sir George Mellish (1814–1877)

1871
John Davison (1825–1871)
Sir John Macpherson Macleod (1792–1881)
Sir John Stuart (1793–1876)
Prince Arthur (1850–1942)
The Earl Cowper (1834–1905)
Sir Frederick Rogers, Bt (1811–1889)
Mountague Bernard (1820–1882)
Sir Edward Thornton (1817–1906)
Sir James Shaw Willes (1814–1872)
Sir Montague Smith (1809–1891)
Sir Edward Lugard (1810–1898)
Sir Robert Collier (1817–1886)

1872
Sir James Hogg, Bt (1790–1876)
Odo Russell (1829–1884)
Lord Richard Grosvenor (1837–1912)
The Lord Poltimore (1837–1908)
Sir William Knollys (1797–1883)
John Dodson (1825–1897)
George Young (1819–1907)
Sir Roundell Palmer (1812–1895)
Peter Erle (1795–1877)
Sir James Hannen (1821–1894)

1873
Sir John Barnard Byles (1801–1884)
William Edward Baxter (1825–1890)
Edward Knatchbull-Hugessen (1829–1893)
The Lord Wolverton (1824–1887)
Sir Henry Bartle Frere (1815–1884)
William Patrick Adam (1823–1881)
Sir George Jessel (1824–1883)
Sir John Coleridge (1820–1894)
Lyon Playfair (1818–1898)

1874
The Lord Monson (1829–1898)
Sir Samuel Martin (1801–1883)
The Earl of Ilchester (1847–1905)
R. A. Cross (1823–1914)
The Marquess of Hertford (1812–1884)
Earl Percy (1846–1918)
The Earl Beauchamp (1830–1891)
Lord Henry Somerset (1849–1932)
The Viscount Barrington (1824–1886)
Viscount Sandon (1831–1900)
The Lord Skelmersdale (1837–1898)
Sir Michael Hicks Beach, Bt (1837–1916)
Sir John Dalrymple-Hay, Bt (1821–1912)
George Sclater-Booth (1826–1894)
Edward Gordon (1814–1879)
Hon. Gerard Noel (1823–1911)
Lord Henry Lennox (1821–1886)
John Hubbard (1805–1889)
Prince Leopold (1853–1884)

1875
The Earl of Shrewsbury (1830–1877)
Sir Henry Keating (1804–1888)
The Marquess of Lorne (1845–1914)
Hon. Sir Charles Murray (1806–1895)
Sir Richard Baggallay (1816–1888)
Sir Richard Couch (1817–1905)
George Cavendish-Bentinck (1821–1891)

1876
Lord Henry Thynne (1832–1904)
Sir John Karslake (1821–1881)
Sir Augustus Paget (1823–1896)
Lord Blackburn (1813–1896)
Sir Henry Montgomery, Bt. (1803–1878)
Sir George Bramwell (1808–1892)
Sir William Brett (1815–1899)
Sir Richard Amphlett (1809–1883)

1877
Henry Cotton (1821–1892)
The Earl of Coventry (1838–1930)
William Henry Smith (1825–1891)
Hon. Alfred Thesiger (1838–1880)
Sir Thomas Myddelton Biddulph (1809–1878)

1878
James Lowther (1840–1904)
The Duke of Devonshire (1808–1891)
William Watson (1827–1899)
Hon. Frederick Stanley (1841–1908)
Lord George Hamilton (1845–1927)
John Arthur Roebuck (1801–1879)

1879
The Earl of Yarmouth (1843–1912)
The Earl of Mount Edgcumbe (1833–1917)
Sir Robert Lush (1807–1881)
Sir John Mellor (1809–1887)
Sir John Macdonald (1815–1891)

1880
The Lord Aveland (1830–1910)
Henry Cecil Raikes (1838–1891)
Hon. David Plunket (1838–1919)
George Cubitt (1828–1917)
Hon. Robert Bourke (1827–1902)
Sir William Hart Dyke, Bt (1837–1931)
Sir Henry Ponsonby (1825–1895)
Alexander Beresford Hope (1820–1887)
The Duke of Westminster (1825–1899)
Sir William Harcourt (1827–1904)
The Earl of Breadalbane (1851–1922)
The Earl Fife (1849–1912)
Lord Charles Bruce (1834–1897)
The Lord Kensington (1835–1896)
Joseph Chamberlain (1836–1914)
A. J. Mundella (1825–1897)
Henry Fawcett (1833–1884)
George Osborne Morgan (1826–1897)
M. E. Grant Duff (1829–1906)
George Shaw-Lefevre (1831–1928)

1881
The Marquess of Huntly (1847–1937)
Sir Arthur Hobhouse (1819–1904)
Sir Richard Malins (1805–1882)
The Lord Carrington (1843–1928)
The Earl of Rosebery (1847–1929)
Sir Nathaniel Lindley (1828–1921)

1882
Sir John Holker (1828–1882)
The Lord FitzGerald (1816–1889)
Sir Charles Bowen (1835–1894)
George Trevelyan (1838–1928)
Sir Charles Dilke, Bt (1843–1911)

1883
Edward White Benson (1829–1896)
Sir Edward Fry (1827–1918)
Sir Hercules Robinson (1824–1897)
Sir Louis Mallet (1823–1890)
Sir Thomas Acland, Bt (1809–1898)
John Balfour (1837–1905)
Sir John Lumley (1818–1896)

1884
Arthur Peel (1829–1912)
Sir Erskine May (1815–1886)
Sir Astley Key (1821–1888)
Henry Campbell-Bannerman (1836–1908)

1885
Sir Robert Morier (1826–1893)
Sir Edward Malet (1837–1908)
Frederick Temple (1821–1902)
Sir John Lambert (1815–1892)
Sir Henry James (1828–1911)
Lord Randolph Churchill (1849–1895)
Hon. Edward Stanhope (1840–1893)
Sir Henry Selwin-Ibbetson, Bt (1826–1902)
Sir Henry Drummond Wolff (1830–1908)
Sir Hardinge Giffard (1823–1921)
Henry Chaplin (1840–1923)
Arthur Balfour (1848–1930)
Edward Gibson (1837–1913)
The Marquess of Waterford (1844–1895)
The Earl Cadogan (1840–1915)
Lord Arthur Hill (1846–1931)
Viscount Folkestone (1841–1900)
Viscount Lewisham (1851–1936)
Sir Arthur Otway, Bt (1822–1912)
William Marriott (1834–1903)
Sir Massey Lopes, Bt (1818–1908)
Sir Harry Verney, Bt (1801–1894)
Sir Francis Sandford (1824–1893)
John Macdonald (1836–1919)
Sir Henry Holland, Bt (1825–1914)
Sir Henry Lopes (1828–1899)
Stephen Flanagan (1817–1891)

1886
The Marquess of Lothian (1833–1900)
Sir Charles Wyke (1815–1897)
Charles Newdegate (1816–1887)
The Earl of Aberdeen (1847–1934)
Sir Farrer Herschell (1837–1899)
John Morley (1838–1923)
Edward Heneage (1840–1922)
The Lord Sudeley (1840–1922)
Hon. Edward Marjoribanks (1849–1909)
The Earl of Elgin (1849–1917)
The Earl of Morley (1843–1905)
Viscount Kilcoursie (1839–1900)
The Lord Suffield (1830–1914)
J. T. Hibbert (1824–1908)
John William Mellor (1835–1911)
The Earl of Dalhousie (1847–1887)
The Lord Thurlow (1838–1916)
John North (1804–1894)
Sir Ughtred Kay-Shuttleworth, Bt (1844–1939)
Henry Fowler (1830–1911)
Sir John Rose, Bt (1820–1888)
Sir John Drummond-Hay (1816–1893)
The Marquess of Londonderry (1852–1915)
Henry Matthews (1826–1913)
Charles Ritchie (1838–1906)
The Duke of Portland (1857–1943)
The Earl of Kintore (1852–1930)
The Earl of Rosslyn (1833–1890)
Sir James Bacon (1798–1895)
Sir George Bowen (1821–1899)

1887
Edward Macnaghten (1830–1913)
The Earl Brownlow (1844–1921)
Sir John Cowell (1832–1894)
Sir William Grove (1811–1896)
William Bede Dalley (1831–1888)

1888
Sir Richard Garth (1820–1903)
The Earl of Lytton (1831–1891)
Sir William White (1824–1891)
Sir Clare Ford (1828–1899)
James Robertson (1845–1909)

1889
The Earl of Limerick (1840–1896)
Leonard Courtney (1832–1918)
Baron Henry de Worms (1840–1903)
The Earl of Zetland (1844–1929)
Sir James Caird (1816–1892)
The Lord Morris (1826–1901)

1890
Sir John Lubbock, Bt (1834–1913)
Sir John Eldon Gorst (1835–1916)
Sir William Field (1813–1907)
The Earl of Jersey (1845–1915)
William Jackson (1840–1917)
Lord Shand (1828–1904)
The Earl of Yarborough (1859–1936)
Sir Edward Kay (1822–1897)

1891
William Connor Magee (1821–1891)
The Lord Windsor (1857–1923)
Sir Charles Butt (1830–1892)
Hon. Evelyn Ashley (1836–1907)
Aretas Akers-Douglas (1851–1926)
William Lidderdale (1832–1902)
William Maclagan (1826–1910)
Lord Walter Gordon-Lennox (1865–1922)
Sir Charles Pearson (1843–1910)
Lord Burghley (1849–1898)

1892
Sir Walter Barttelot, Bt (1820–1893)
Arthur Forwood (1836–1898)
The Lord Balfour of Burleigh (1849–1921)
Sir Francis Jeune (1843–1905)
Sir Archibald Levin Smith (1836–1901)
Sir James Parker Deane (1812–1902)
The Lord Houghton (1858–1945)
Arnold Morley (1849–1916)
H. H. Asquith (1852–1928)
Arthur Acland (1847–1926)
James Bryce (1838–1922)
Sir Matthew Ridley, Bt (1842–1904)
Jesse Collings (1831–1920)
Thomas Henry Huxley (1825–1895)
Robert Duff (1835–1895)
Hon. Charles Spencer (1857–1922)
Herbert Gardner (1846–1921)
Charles Seale-Hayne (1833–1903)
The Lord Vernon (1854–1898)
The Lord Ribblesdale (1854–1925)
Christopher Palles (1831–1920)
Alexander Hill (1825–1905)

1893
George Denman (1819–1896)
Sir Alfred Stephen (1802–1894)
The Lord Vivian (1834–1893)
Hon. Sir Edmund Monson (1834–1909)
Sir Horace Davey (1833–1907)

1894
Sir Philip Currie (1834–1906)
Sir Algernon West (1832–1921)
Herbert Gladstone (1854–1930)
The Earl of Chesterfield (1854–1933)
Sir Charles Russell (1832–1900)
Sir George Grey (1812–1898)
Sir Frank Lascelles (1841–1920)
Sir Arthur Hayter, Bt (1835–1917)
Jacob Bright (1821–1899)
Prince George, Duke of York (1865–1936)
Prince Christian of Schleswig-Holstein (1831–1917)
Prince Henry of Battenberg (1858–1896)
Sir John Rigby (1834–1903)
Sir Julian Pauncefote (1828–1902)
Sir John Thompson (1844–1894)

1895
Cecil Rhodes (1853–1902)
William Gully (1835–1909)
The Lord Leigh (1824–1905)
Sir Henry Loch (1827–1900)
Hon. George Curzon (1859–1925)
Robert Hanbury (1845–1903)
The Marquess of Lansdowne (1845–1927)
Sir Bernard Samuelson, Bt (1820–1905)
Sir Ralph Thompson (1830–1902)
Walter Long (1854–1924)
The Duke of Norfolk (1847–1917)
The Earl of Pembroke (1853–1913)
The Earl of Hopetoun (1860–1908)
The Lord Belper (1840–1914)
Sir Fleetwood Edwards (1842–1910)
Sir Julian Goldsmid, Bt (1838–1896)
Sir Richard Paget, Bt (1832–1908)
Francis Foljambe (1830–1917)

1896
Sir Richard Temple, Bt (1826–1902)
Charles Stuart-Wortley (1851–1926)
Sir Nicholas O'Conor (1843–1908)
Max Müller (1823–1900)
Andrew Murray (1849–1942)
Sir Horace Rumbold, Bt (1829–1913)

1897
Sir Joseph Chitty (1828–1899)
Hon. St John Brodrick (1856–1942)
Sir John Kennaway, Bt (1837–1919)
The Earl Waldegrave (1851–1930)
Mandell Creighton (1843–1901)
Samuel Way (1836–1916)
Sir John de Villiers (1842–1914)
Sir Samuel Henry Strong (1825–1909)
Sir Wilfrid Laurier (1841–1919)
George Reid (1845–1918)
Sir George Turner (1851–1916)
Richard Seddon (1845–1906)
Sir Hugh Nelson (1833–1906)
Sir Gordon Sprigg (1830–1913)
Charles Kingston (1850–1908)
Sir William Whiteway (1828–1908)
Sir John Forrest (1847–1918)
Sir Edward Braddon (1829–1904)
Harry Escombe (1838–1899)
William Edward Hartpole Lecky (1838–1903)
John Talbot (1835–1910)
John Wharton (1837–1912)
Sir Herbert Maxwell, Bt (1845–1937)
Sir Richard Collins (1842–1911)
Sir Roland Vaughan Williams (1838–1916)

1898
Sir George Goldie (1846–1925)
James Alexander Campbell (1825–1908)
James Lowther (1855–1949)
Edmond Wodehouse (1835–1914)
Sir Charles Scott (1838–1924)

1899
The Duke of Marlborough (1871–1934)
Sir Charles Hall (1843–1900)
Edward Saunderson (1837–1906)
William Kenrick (1831–1919)
The Lord Brampton (1817–1907)
Sir William Walrond, Bt (1849–1925)
Sir Robert Romer (1840–1918)

1900
The Lord Rowton (1838–1903)
Bramston Beach (1826–1901)
Sir Ford North (1830–1913)
Sir Richard Webster, Bt (1842–1915)
Sir Frederick Milner, Bt (1849–1931)
The Viscount Cromer (1841–1917)
The Earl of Clarendon (1846–1914)
The Earl of Selborne (1859–1942)
Gerald Balfour (1853–1945)
Joseph Powell-Williams (1840–1904)
Gerald FitzGibbon (1837–1909)
Sir James Stirling (1836–1916)
William Ellison-Macartney (1852–1924)

References

1837